Wijewardena Seneviratne Panditha Abeykoon Bandaranayake Wahala Mudiyanselage Harris Leuke Ratwatte (known as Harris Leuke Ratwatte) (1900–1964) was a Ceylonese legislator. He was a member of the State Council of Ceylon, Parliament and the Senate of Ceylon. Ratwatte was award the title of Dissawa by the British Governor of Ceylon and was elected as the Diyawadana Nilame of Sri Dalada Maligawa, Kandy.

Born to Abeyratne Banda Ratwatte and Thalgahagoda Lewke Punchi Kumarihamy, his brothers were Sir Cuda Ratwatte Adigar former mayor of Kandy and Barnes Ratwatte Dissawa who was also a member of the State Council.

In 1933 he became the Basnayake Nilame of the Kataragama Devale of Kandy and the Maha Vishnu Devale of Kandy. He was elected to the State Council in 1936 from Kegalle and held the seat until 1947. From 1940 to 1942 he was a member of the Kandy Municipal Council. In 1948 he was elected to the House of Representatives from Mawanella and held the seat until 1952. In 1955 he was elected to the Senate. He was elected to the post of Diyawadana Nilame of the Sri Dalada Maligawa in 1961 and held the post until his death in 1964.

Harris Leuke Ratwatte married Mallika Katugaha Kumarihamy, daughter of Katugaha Bandaranayake Herath Mudiyanse Punchi Bandara, acting Rate Mahatmaya of Yatikinda. Harris Ratwatte and his Kumarihamy had nine children: Ryan, Ivy, Dennis, Chintha, Preeni, Anuruddha, Ranji, Samudhra & Mangalika. His son General Anuruddha Ratwatte was a Cabinet Minister. His grandson Lohan is the Member of Parliament representing the Kandy District and another grandson, Mahendra was  a former mayor of Kandy.

See also
Diyawadana Nilame, Sri Dalada Maligawa, Kandy
List of political families in Sri Lanka

References

External links
The Ratwatte Ancestry

Diyawadana Nilames
Sri Lankan Buddhists
Dissava
Sinhalese politicians
United National Party politicians
Members of the 2nd State Council of Ceylon
Members of the Senate of Ceylon
Members of the 1st Parliament of Ceylon
Harris Leuke
1900 births
1964 deaths